Judo for the Blind is the debut EP of noise rock band Tragic Mulatto, released in 1984 by Alternative Tentacles.

Music 
The band's sound has been described as jazz-tinged Flipper.

Release and reception 
Despite the band's peculiar demeanor, Judo for the Blind has been received positively. Ira Robbins of the Trouser Press praised the record, saying that "some numbers are faster and well-organized to the point where they resemble a '40s big band on bad drugs; others could be an incompetent jazz combo vainly tuning up while someone soundchecks the microphones."

Track listing

Personnel 
Adapted from the Judo for the Blind liner notes.

Tragic Mulatto
 Gail Coulson (as A Piece of Eczema) – saxophone, illustrations
 Lance Boyle (as Fluffy) – bass guitar, backing vocals
 Karl Konnerth (as Sweetums) – trumpet
 Daved Marsh (as Flossy) – vocals
 Patrick Marsh (as Blossom) – drums

Production and additional personnel
 John Cuniberti – engineering
 Klaus Flouride – production

Release history

References 

1984 debut EPs
Tragic Mulatto (band) albums
Albums produced by Klaus Flouride
Alternative Tentacles EPs